Cornacchia is an Italian surname.

Cornacchia may also refer to:

 Cornacchia, a frazione of San Polo d'Enza, Reggio Emilia, Italy
 Monte Cornacchia (disambiguation), two mountains in Italy

See also
 Cornacchia's algorithm, described in 1908 by Giuseppe Cornacchia
 Stadio Adriatico – Giovanni Cornacchia, a stadium in Pescara, Abruzzo, Italy